The list of shipwrecks in 1955 includes ships sunk, foundered, grounded, or otherwise lost during 1955.

January

2 January

7 January

10 January

13 January

15 January

16 January

17 January

18 January

20 January

21 January

22 January

23 January

24 January

25 January

February

4 February

12 February

14 February

19 February

21 February

22 February

March

2 March

8 March

14 March

20 March

23 March

24 March

25 March

28 March

29 March

April

18 April

22 April

24 April

26 April

May

6 May

7 May

9 May

10 May

11 May

18 May

22 May

23 May

24 May

29 May

30 May

Unknown date

June

8 June

9 June

10 June

16 June

26 June

July

8 July

12 July

13 July

14 July

15 July

16 July

17 July

20 July

21 July

22 July

23 July

27 July

28 July

29 July

August

4 August

6 August

10 August

11 August

14 August

25 August

27 August

28 August

Unknown date

September

4 September

9 September

15 September

16 September

26 September

30 September

October

4 October

6 October

11 October

12 October

14 October

16 October

19 October

21 October

26 October

27 October

28 October

29 October

November

9 November

10 November

11 November

12 November

15 November

16 November

18 November

23 November

25 November

December

9 December

14 December

18 December

19 December

27 December

Unknown date

References

See also 

1955
 
Ships